The 2018 Copa CONMEBOL Sudamericana was the 17th edition of the CONMEBOL Sudamericana (also referred to as the Copa Sudamericana, or ), South America's secondary club football tournament organized by CONMEBOL.

Brazilian club Atlético Paranaense defeated Colombian club Junior by 4–3 on penalties in the finals after a 2–2 draw on aggregate score to win their first tournament title. As champions, Atlético Paranaense earned the right to play against the winners of the 2018 Copa Libertadores in the 2019 Recopa Sudamericana, and the winners of the 2018 J.League Cup in the 2019 J.League Cup / Copa Sudamericana Championship. They also automatically qualified for the 2019 Copa Libertadores group stage. Independiente were the defending champions, but did not play in this edition as they qualified for the 2018 Copa Libertadores group stage as Copa Sudamericana champions and later advanced to the knockout stage.

Teams
The following 44 teams from the 10 CONMEBOL associations qualified for the tournament, entering the first stage:
Argentina and Brazil: 6 berths each
All other associations: 4 berths each

A further 10 teams eliminated from the 2018 Copa Libertadores were transferred to the Copa Sudamericana, entering the second stage.

Schedule
The schedule of the competition was as follows.

Draws

First stage

Second stage

Final stages

Seeding

Bracket

Round of 16

Quarterfinals

Semifinals

Finals

Statistics

Top scorers

Top assists

See also
2018 Copa Libertadores
2019 Recopa Sudamericana
2019 J.League Cup / Copa Sudamericana Championship

References

External links
CONMEBOL Sudamericana 2018, CONMEBOL.com

 
2018
2